Rebel is a 2012 Indian Telugu-language action film written and directed by Raghava Lawrence. Starring Prabhas, Tamannaah Bhatia, Mukesh Rishi and Deeksha Seth, the film is produced by J. Bhaghawan and J. Pulla Rao under the Sri Balaji Cine Media banner. The story revolves around Rishi,  a young rebel who is out to seek revenge on the murderers of his family. But to get at them he first needs to befriend Nandini, a hip-hop dancer who resides at Bangkok and he will not stop at nothing to get his goal.

Lawrence also handled the choreography and composed the music. Released on 28 September 2012, the film was a huge commercial failure at the box office.

Plot 
Rishi  is the happy-go-lucky son of Bhupathi, a powerful dictator of the village, who is liked by the villagers. Rishi is influenced by his father's ideals and grows up just like him. However, Bhupathi does not want his son to take up violence and sends him to Bangalore for studies and to learn music. There, Rishi falls for an orphan named Deepali and brings her to his house in the disguise of his old music teacher as he wants his father to be happy that he does not take up the violence. During the festivals held in their village, Simhadri sends 100 thugs to kill Bhupathi and his family, but Rishi eliminates all the thugs. Bhupathi's brother Jayram joins hands with Simhadri so that they can kill Bhupathi, Bhupathi's wife Lakshmi, and Deepali. Simhadri tells Rishi that a local goon helped Jayram kill Bhupathi and his family. Simhadri soon kills himself, and Rishi stabs his dead body multiple times. Some of Bhupathi's bodyguards are still alive, including Raju. They assist Rishi to get revenge.

Two years later, Rishi discovers that a goon named Stephen was doing illegal business in Hyderabad for a very long time. Rishi also discovers that Robert is none other than his uncle Jayram. Robert started working with Stephen right after Bhupathi's murder. Stephen and Robert became powerful gangsters. Rishi suspects that Jayaram's new identity is Robert. He leaves to Hyderabad and finds that Stephen and Robert have an assistant named Nanu, who works in Bangkok. Nanu's daughter is Nandini. She and Rishi fall in love with each other. Nanu shows his phone to Nandini because she wants to see the pictures of Stephen and Robert. When Rishi sees the pictures, he is confirmed that Jayaram's new identity is Robert. Since Simhadri told Rishi that a local goon helped Robert kill Bhupathi, and that goon must have been Stephen. Later, Raju reveals to Nandini about Rishi's tragic past. Nandini still wants to help Rishi locate Stephen and Robert.

Rishi bribes Nanu's henchmen to stop protecting Nanu. Rishi then tortures Nanu until the latter agrees to lure Stephen and Robert into a trap. It is revealed that Stephen and Robert sent two henchmen to disguise themselves as Stephen and Robert. Nanu's glad that Stephen and Robert fooled Rishi. Rishi realizes that his bodyguards, Raju, and Nandini got kidnapped by the bad guys. Robert tells Rishi that he sent his henchmen to kidnap Rishi's bodyguards, Raju, and Nandini. Rishi gets taken to his old home, and the rest of his bodyguards, including Raju get killed, yet Nandini is alive. Stephen and his henchman brutally beats up Rishi making him faint. Rishi get glimpses of his family and gets up, beats all the henchman, kills Stephen, kills Robert's son and thrashes Robert, where he shoots him in the same style, like how Robert shot Bhupathi. In the end, Rishi and Nandini reunite each other.

Cast 

 Prabhas as Rishi / Rebel, a happy-go-lucky music student who grows up like his father Bhupathi and wants to take revenge on the latter's death
 Tamannaah Bhatia as Nandini, Nanu's daughter who falls in love with Rishi and wants to help him take revenge.
 Mukesh Rishi as Jayram aka Robert, Simhadri's helper, Bhupathi's brother, Rishi's parental uncle and Stephen's assistant and an underworld don
 Deeksha Seth as Deepali, an orphan whom Rishi falls in love but dies in the hands of Bhupathi and Lakshmi's son
 Krishnam Raju as Bhupathi, Rishi's father and a powerful and wealthy dictator of the village, who is liked by the villagers. He does not want his son to be like him but ends up being killed by Simhadri and Jayram 
 Brahmanandam as Narasa Raju
 Ali as Kamal Haasan Shiv Shankar
 Prabha as Lakshmi, Bhupathi's wife who also gets killed by Jayram alias Robert 
 Pradeep Rawat as Simhadri. Bhupathi, Lakshmi, and Deepali's killer and local politician who committed suicide
 Supreeth as Raju, Bhupathi's henchman who helps Rishi take revenge but gets killed by Stephen and Robert
 Tej Sapru as Nanu, Stephen and Robert's assistant and Nandini's father who works in Bangkok
 K. C. Shankar as Stephen, a goon and underworld don who has been doing illegal business in Hyderabad
 Vikram Singh as David
 Bharath Reddy as Jayram's son
 M. S. Narayana as Shastri
 Ananth Babu as Shastri
 Ravi Nair as Sanjay
 Junior Relangi as Junior Shastri
 Kelly Dorji as APC-MI6
 Sriman as Ajay
 Chalapathi Rao as Police Officer
 Vincent Asokan as Varadan
 Jeeva as Shankar
 Kovai Sarala as Nandini's aunt
 Hema as Rishi's aunt
 Shanoor Sana as Nandini's friend
 Rajitha as Nandini's aunt

Production 
The film was officially launched at Annapurna Studios on 2 December 2010 with Anushka Shetty as the heroine opposite Prabhas. It was also announced that S. Thaman would compose the soundtrack of the film.

Casting 
On 2 December 2010, the opening ceremony of the film took place in Hyderabad. At the event, it was announced that J. Bhagawan and J. Pullarao would produce the film, it would be directed by Raghava Lawrence and would star Prabhas and Anushka in lead roles. The main cast was also announced during the event, which included Brahmanandam, Mukesh Rishi, Kelly Dorjee, Sayaji Shinde, Ali, MS Narayana, Chalapathi Rao, Jayaprakash Reddy, Supreet and Jeeva. In February 2011, it was announced that Deeksha Seth would play the second lead in the film. The filming was delayed due to various reasons causing Anushka to opt out of the project. In August 2011, it was announced that Tamannaah had replaced Anushka. In January 2011, it was reported that Krishnam Raju would play a vital role in the film. It was later confirmed that he would be portraying a father character while popular Telugu actress Prabha would play the role of a mother.

Filming 
After much delays, regular filming began on 21 May 2011. In the fifty days of working schedule, one action episode and a song were filmed. In October 2011, it was reported that the filming would take place in Bangkok, where action sequences would be shot. In December 2011, it was reported that the unit would go back to Bangkok to shoot some vital scenes and action sequences with Tamannah and Prabhas. After completing the Bangkok schedule, filming resumed at Shamshabad Temple near Hyderabad. It was reported that a special set worth 20 million was built at Shamshabad and filming took place in it with 100 fighters and over 1000 extras participating in the schedule. In March 2012, it was reported that another set had been built at Ramoji Film City, where the climax scenes with 30 Russian fighters were shot.

In June 2012, the unit went back to Bangkok for the third time to shoot two songs of the movie. After completing the schedule, the filming resumed at Pollachi where scenes on Prabhas and other lead cast were canned. The filming shifted to Pondicherry where action episodes involving Prabhas were shot. The last schedule of filming took at an aluminium factory in Hyderabad.

Release

Theatrical 
The film was postponed several times due to delays in post-production works. After much delay, the film was released worldwide on 28 September 2012 in over 950 screens worldwide.

Distribution 
It was announced that 7 Seas, a premier entertainment company, purchased the overseas theatrical distribution rights of the film. The theatrical distribution rights for the Nizam region were bought by Dil Raju for 90 million. The rights for Vizag region were sold to Bellamkonda Suresh for 30.6 million. Distribution rights for ceded region were bought by NV Prasad and Bellary Sai for 57.5 million. Tamil Nadu theatrical distribution rights were sold for 3.3 million. The film made excellent business all over and is up amongst the best films in terms of pre-release revenues.

Reception

Box office 
Rebel collected 65 crores in its lifetime but since it was against a lavish budget of 50 crores it wasn’t commercially successful. Purnima Ranawat from  NDTV  said, "Rebel serves up fare for the mass audience. The film will be definitely liked by Prabhas' fans. Watch it for the dancing talent of Tamannaah Bhatia and action skills of Prabhas." Radhika Rajamani from Rediff.com gave the movie one and half stars out of five and said, "Working with hardly any storyline, director Raghava Lawrence had made a film that is arduous to watch... Rebel is a movie for the masses and certainly not for the discerning audience."

Jeevi from Idlebrain.com gave the film a 3 out of 5 rating and stated, "Rebel is an revenge-based action film. Prabhas is known as one of the best mass stars of Telugu cinema. Lawrence's movies are known to appeal to the raw senses of mass movie lovers. Rebel is no exception. Interval block is really good. Rebel has decent commercial elements and targeted at masses. Masses will like it. A reviewer from OneIndia.com  called the film "A treat for Prabhas fans" and gave it a 3 out of 5 rating.

Remakes and dubbed versions
The film was remade into Bangladeshi cinema as Hero: The Superstar starring Shakib Khan, Apu Biswas and Bobby.

The film was dubbed into Hindi as The Return of Rebel, the film was also dubbed and released in Malayalam in the same title on 8 December 2015 and in Tamil as Veerabali and were released respectively on and 11 December 2015.

Soundtrack 

Initially S. Thaman was revealed to be the composer but he opted out of the film; instead, Raghava Lawrence himself composed the songs while the film score was composed by S. Chinna. The soundtrack of the film was released through Aditya Music label on 14 September 2012 at Shilpakala Vedika in Hyderabad. The album consists of five songs. The lyrics for four songs were penned by Ramajogayya Sastry and one song was written by Bhaskarabhatla.

References

External links 
 

2012 films
2010s Telugu-language films
Indian action films
Indian films about revenge
2012 action films
Films set in Singapore
Films shot in Singapore
Telugu films remade in other languages
Films shot in Bangkok
Films shot in Puducherry
Films shot in Pollachi
2012 masala films
Films directed by Raghava Lawrence